Emerico Amari (1810–1870) was an Italian jurist and a pioneer of comparative law.

Although of Sicilian aristocratic origin, Amari was a liberal thinker. After assuming the University of Palermo professorship for penal law in 1841, he entered politics in 1848 and fled shortly thereafter to Florence, where he taught philosophy until his return to Sicily in 1860.

Although he began his career as a penal law specialist with interest in criminal statistics, his main work is the seminal Criticism of the science of comparative law of 1857.

References

External links
 

Jurists from Palermo
1810 births
1870 deaths
Academic staff of the University of Palermo
Burials at San Domenico, Palermo
19th-century Italian jurists